The Tjalkadjara or Tjalkanti were an indigenous Australian tribe of Western Australia.

Country
The Tjalkadjara's tribal homelands lay northeast of Laverton as far as Lake Throssell. Their confines were in the vicinity of Darlot to the west, and to the north, around Lake Wells. Norman Tindale estimated their tribal lands as once having covered . Their neighbouring tribes were the Pini on their northeastern and northern flank; the Ngaanyatjarra to the northeast; the Mandjindja and the Nangatadjara east-southeast; the Waljen to their south, and the Kuwarra to their west.

Resources
The water sources available to the Tjalkadjara were scarce and in good part they had to rely on what they could extract from the roots of eucalyptus. They possessed a mine north of Laverton, at Taralguta, which was rich in solid red ochre that was much prized by other neighbouring tribes, and which formed an important part of their trading with others.

History
The Tjalkadjara were eventually pushed out of their southern territory and forced to shift northwest to Darlot at the turn of the 19-20th centuries, as pressure was brought to bear on them from the Nangatadjara.

Alternative names
 Tjalkumara
 Tjalkandjara
 Tjalkakari. ( "come this way")
 Wordako. (language name)
 Tjalkani
 Djalgani, Djalgandi, Tjalgandi
 Erlistoun tribe.
 Dituwonga. (Waljen exonym).

Notes

Citations

Sources

Aboriginal peoples of Western Australia